The 2003 Sky Bet UK Open was the first edition of the UK Open darts tournament organised by the Professional Darts Corporation. The tournament was held at the Reebok Stadium in Bolton, England between 30 May–1 June 2003.

The tournament was unique as it had no seeding, and was won by Phil Taylor who defeated Shayne Burgess in the final 18–8 in legs. The Order of Merit can be found on this link here

Friday 30 May 2003

Preliminary round
best of 9 legs				
	 John Henderson	–   Paul Amos 	5 – 4
	 Wayne Palfrey	–  Tom Kirby 	5 – 4
	 Paul Hogan	–  Deta Hedman 	5 – 3

1st round
best of 9 legs				
	 Mark Thomson	–	Marshall James 	5 – 4
	 John King	–	Colin Monk 	1 – 5
	 Les Fitton	–	James Greenfield 	5 – 1
	 Dave Smith	–	Dean Taylor 	5 – 1
	 Bob Crawley –	Gary Stevens 	5 – 4
	 Andy Belton	–	Shayne Burgess  	4 – 5
	 Terry Jenkins	–	Keith Rooney 	5 – 3
	 John Ferrell	–	Peter Allen 	4 – 5
	 John Nesbitt	–	Brendan Dolan 	5 – 4
	 Dave Jowett	–	Chris Gough 	5 – 1
	 David Platt	–	Martyn Freeman 	5 – 2
	 Bill Burksfield	–	John Henderson 	5 – 0
	 Dave Roberts	–	Rod Harrington 	1 – 5
	 Wayne Merrick	–	Keith Wright 	5 – 3
	 David Peploe	–	Wayne Davies 	2 – 5
	 Crissy Manley	–	Wayne Palfrey 	2 – 5
	 Chris McTernan	–	Paul Whitworth 	4 – 5
	 Jim Regan	–	Matt Chapman 	2 – 5
	 Tony Wood	–	Mick Carrick 	0 – 5
	 Paul Butler	–	Paul Hogan 	3 – 5
	 Simon Laws	–	Chris Kenny 	2 – 5
	 Nigel Justice	–	Norman Fletcher 	1 – 5
	 Michael Kendrick	– Wayne Atwood 	3 – 5
	 Robert Heard	–	Adam King 	5 – 0
	 Dean Williams	–	Leon Womack 	5 – 2
	 Steve Evans	–	Nigel Peden 	0 – 5
	 Steve Parsons	–	Dave Weston 	2 – 5
	 Andrew Gillam	–	Mick Booth 	2 – 5
	 Dick Brittain	–	Glynn Carus 	1 – 5
	 Darren Webster	–	Keith Read 	5 – 2
	 Andy Smith	–	Martin Dunford 	5 – 0
	 Darren Moulsley	–	Ian Burnett 	2 – 5

2nd round
best of 9 legs				
	 Reg Harding	–	Steve Beaton  	2 – 5
	 Darren Webster	–	John Lowe 	3 – 5
	 Paul Carter	–	Cliff Lazarenko 	4 – 5
	 Sean Palfrey	–	Keith Deller 	4 – 5
	 Glynn Carus	–	Wesley Newton 	0 – 5
	 Mark Holden	–	Wayne Davies 	4 – 5
	 Ken Thomas	–	Wayne Atwood 	5 – 3
	 Ian Cullingworth	–	Ian Covill 	3 – 5
	 Chris Kenny	–	Roy Montgomery 	5 – 0
	 Mick Booth	–	Andrew Davies 	1 – 5
	 Dave Weston	–	Mark Thomson 	1 – 5
	 Vic Hubbard	–	Steve Maish 	0 – 5
	 Nigel Peden	–	John Nesbitt 	.. – ..
	 Barrie Bates	–	Paul Whitworth 	5 – 0
	 Bob Crawley	–	Les Fitton 	1 – 5
	 Mark Robinson	–	Alan Green 	5 – 1
	 Andy Smith	–	Colin Monk 	1 – 5
	 Wayne Merrick	–	Matt Chapman 	3 – 5
	 Norman Fletcher	–	Adrian Gray 	1 – 5
	 Henry O'Neill	–	Steve Brown 	5 – 4
	 Dean Williams	–	Dave Smith 	3 – 5
	 Terry Jenkins	–	Paul Hogan 	5 – 1
	 David Platt	–	Rod Harrington 	5 – 2
	 Mick Manning	–	Robbie Widdows 	4 – 5
	 Willie Burksfield	–	Graeme Stoddart 	5 – 1
	 Dave Jowett	–	Ian Burnett 	5 – 1
	 Lionel Sams	–	Mick Carrick 	5 – 2
	 Mick Savvery	–	Andy Keen 	5 – 3
	 Shayne Burgess	–	Robert Heard 	5 – 0
	 Keith Wetton	–	Andy Hayfield 	2 – 5
	 Wayne Palfrey	–	Peter Allen 	3 – 5

Saturday 31 May

3rd round
best of 9 legs				
	 Mark Dudbridge	–	Cliff Lazarenko  	2 – 5
	 John MaGowan	–	Wayne Jones 	3 – 5
	 Al Hedman	–	Shayne Burgess 	4 – 5
	 Robbie Widdows	–	Alan Reynolds  	2 – 5
	 Peter Manley	–	Ken Thomas 	5 – 1
	 Dave Smith	–	Chris Kenny 	5 – 0
	 Dennis Priestley	–	Ian Covill 	5 – 2
	 Peter Allen	–	Tom Wilson 	3 – 5
	 Alex Roy	–	Peter Evison 	5 – 2
	 Dave Askew	–	Dennis Smith 	3 – 5
	 Wayne Davies	–	Paul Dillon 	1 – 5
	 Henry O'Neill	–	Andrew Davies 	5 – 2
	 Simon Whatley	–	Barrie Bates 	5 – 3
	 John Lowe	–	Mark Walsh 	4 – 5
	 Andy Jenkins	–	Keith Deller 	5 – 3
	 Colin Monk	–	Matt Chapman 	5 – 1
	 Mark Robinson	–	Mark Thomson 	3 – 5
	 John Part	–	Lee Palfreyman 	5 – 2
	 Terry Jenkins	–	Denis Ovens 	3 – 5
	 Dave Jowett	–	Colin Lloyd 	2 – 5
	 Paul Williams	–	Jamie Harvey 	5 – 4
	 Nigel Peden	–	Les Hodkinson 	1 – 5
	 Steve Johnson	–	Adrian Gray 	3 – 5
	 Steve Beaton	–	Steve Maish 	.. – ..
	 Kevin Painter	–	Phil Taylor 	3 – 5
	 Richie Burnett	–	Alan Caves 	5 – 1
	 Bill Burksfield	–	Mick Savvery 	.. – ..
	 James Wade	–	Ronnie Baxter 	5 – 4
	 Alan Warriner-Little	–	Wayne Mardle 	3 – 5
	 Roland Scholten	–	Lionel Sams 	5 – 0
	 David Platt	–	Les Fitton 	3 – 5
	 Andy Hayfield	–	Wesley Newton 	0 – 5

4th round
best of 15 legs				
	 Richie Burnett	–	Steve Beaton  	2 – 8
	 Roland Scholten	–	Wayne Mardle 	8 – 6
	 Phil Taylor	–	Dennis Smith 	8 – 3
	 John Part	–	Peter Manley 	8 – 6
	 Alex Roy	–	James Wade 	8 – 4
	 Colin Monk	–	Alan Reynolds 	8 – 2
	 Shayne Burgess	–	Simon Whatley 	8 – 6
	 Denis Ovens	–	Dennis Priestley 	3 – 8
	 Adrian Gray	–	Colin Lloyd 	8 – 7
	 Andy Jenkins	–	Tom Wilson 	3 – 8
	 Cliff Lazarenko	–	Les Hodkinson 	8 – 6
	 Henry O'Neill	–	Wayne Jones 	1 – 8
	 Paul Williams	–	Les Fitton 	8 – 5
	 Wesley Newton	–	Mark Thomson 	6 – 8
	 Mark Walsh	–	Paul Dillon 	6 – 8
	 Dave Smith	–	Willie Burksfield 	8 – 4

5th Round – Last 16
best of 17 legs				
	 Paul Williams	–	Alex Roy 	9 – 8
	 Roland Scholten	–	Steve Beaton 	9 – 7
	 Phil Taylor	–  Paul Dillon 	9 – 1
	 Colin Monk	–	John Part  	9 – 8
	 Tom Wilson	–	Mark Thomson 	9 – 4
	 Dave Smith	–	Adrian Gray 	9 – 6
	 Shayne Burgess	–	Cliff Lazarenko 	9 – 7
	 Wayne Jones	–	Dennis Priestley  	9 – 5

Sunday 1 June

Last 8 to final

References

UK Open
UK Open
UK Open
UK Open
UK Open